Rzeczyca  is a village in the administrative district of Gmina Maszewo, within Krosno Odrzańskie County, Lubusz Voivodeship, Poland. It has a population of 60.

References

Villages in Krosno Odrzańskie County